Tyler James may refer to:

 Tyler James (American musician) (born 1982), American singer-songwriter
 Tyler James (English musician) (born 1985), English singer-songwriter

See also
James Tyler (disambiguation)
Tyler James Williams (born 1992), American actor and musician